Down on the Farm is a 1920 silent film feature-length rural comedy produced by Mack Sennett, starring Louise Fazenda, and featuring Harry Gribbon, James Finlayson and Billy Armstrong. It premiered at the Yost Theater in Santa Ana, California on December 28–30, 1919, and was released nationally three months later, opening at the Strand Theatre in Fort Wayne, Indiana on April 4, 1920.

Copies survive at the Library of Congress and reportedly at Gosfilmofond, Russian State Archive.

Cast
Louise Fazenda as Louise, The Farmer's Daughter
Harry Gribbon as The Rustic Sweetheart
Bert Roach as Roach, The Farmer
James Finlayson as The Sportive Banker with the Mortgage
Billy Armstrong as The Man of Mystery
Don Marion as The Baby (credited as  John Henry, Jr.)
Marie Prevost as The Faithful Wife
Ben Turpin as The Faithful Wife's Husband
Dave Anderson as Grocery Man
Joseph Belmont as The Minister
Eddie Gribbon as Banker's Henchman
Kalla Pasha as Mailman
Fanny Kelly as Gossipy Villager
Sybil Seely as Maid of Honor (credited as Sibye Trevilla)

Uncredited performers 
Jane Allen 
Thelma Bates
Pepper The Cat as herself
Teddy The Dog as himself
Elva Diltz
Frank Earle
Virginia Fox
George Gray
Harriet Hammond as herself, Prologue
Phyllis Haver as herself, Prologue
Mildred June 
Patrick Kelly as Villager
Larry Lyndon as Villager
Kathryn McGuire as Villager
John Rand as Villager
Eva Thatcher as Villager

References

External links

 
 
allmovie listing

1920 films
Films directed by Erle C. Kenton
United Artists films
1920 comedy films
Silent American comedy films
American black-and-white films
American silent feature films
Films directed by F. Richard Jones
1920s American films